Phoberus is a genus of hide beetle in the subfamily Troginae. It was initially a subgenus of Trox before taxonomists reorganized it into its own genus. The genus is monophyletic, with all species evolved from a single common ancestor. Most beetle species in the genus live in Africa.

It contains the following species:

Phoberus aculeatus (Harold, 1872)
Phoberus arcuatus (Haaf, 1953)
Phoberus braacki (Scholtz, 1980)
Phoberus brincki (Haaf, 1958)
Phoberus bulirschi (Huchet, 2020)
Phoberus caffer (Harold, 1872)
Phoberus capensis (Scholtz, 1979)
Phoberus consimilis (Haaf, 1953)
Phoberus cyrtus (Haaf, 1953)
Phoberus disjunctus (Strümpher, 2016)
Phoberus elmariae (van der Merwe & Scholtz, 2005)
Phoberus fascicularis (Wiedemann, 1821)
Phoberus fumarius (Haaf, 1953)
Phoberus gunki (Scholtz, 1980)
Phoberus herminae (Strümpher, 2016)
Phoberus horridus (Fabricius, 1775)
Phoberus levis (Haaf, 1953)
Phoberus lilianae (Scholtz, 1980)
Phoberus luridus (Fabricius, 1781)
Phoberus miliarius (Gmelin, 1790)
Phoberus montanus (Kolbe, 1891)
Phoberus mozalae (Strümpher & Scholtz, 2009)
Phoberus nama (Kolbe, 1908)
Phoberus nanniscus (Péringuey, 1901)
Phoberus nasutus (Harold, 1872)
Phoberus natalensis (Haaf, 1954)
Phoberus necopinus (Scholtz, 1986)
Phoberus ngomensis (van der Merwe & Scholtz, 2005)
Phoberus nigrociliatus (Kolbe, 1904)
Phoberus ntlenyanae (Strümpher, 2019)
Phoberus nyansanus (Haaf, 1953)
Phoberus nyassicus (Haaf, 1953)
Phoberus nyikanus (Strümpher, 2017)
Phoberus penicillatus (Fahraeus, 1857)
Phoberus perrieri (Fairmaire, 1899)
Phoberus planicollis (Haaf, 1953)
Phoberus puncticollis (Haaf, 1953)
Phoberus pusillus (Péringuey, 1908)
Phoberus quadricostatus (Scholtz, 1980)
Phoberus ranotsaraensis (Pittino, 2010)
Phoberus rhyparoides (Harold, 1872)
Phoberus rudebecki (Haaf, 1958)
Phoberus squamiger (Roth, 1851)
Phoberus sternbergi (van der Merwe & Scholtz, 2005)
Phoberus strigosus (Haaf, 1953)
Phoberus sulcatus (Thunberg, 1787)
Phoberus talpa (Fahraeus, 1857)
Phoberus youngai (Strümpher & Scholtz, 2011)

References

Trogidae